The QTY Code is a design method to transform membrane proteins that are intrinsically insoluble in water into variants with water solubility, while retaining their structure and function.

Similar structures of amino acids 
The QTY Code is based on two key molecular structural facts: 1) all 20 natural amino acids are found in alpha-helices regardless of their chemical properties, although some amino acids have a higher propensity to form an alpha-helix; and, 2) several amino acids share striking structural similarities despite their very different chemical properties. These may be paired as: Glutamine (Q) vs Leucine (L); Threonine (T) vs Valine (V) and Isoleucine (I); and Tyrosine (Y) vs Phenylalanine (F).   The QTY Code systematically replaces water-insoluble amino acids (L, V, I and F) with water-soluble amino acids (Q, T and Y) in transmembrane alpha-helices. Thus, its application to membrane proteins changes the water-insoluble form of membrane proteins into water-soluble variants.  The QTY Code was specifically conceived to render G protein-coupled receptors (GPCRs) into a water-soluble form. Despite substantial transmembrane domain changes, the QTY variants of GPCRs maintain stable structure and ligand binding activities.

Hydrogen bond interactions between water and the amino acids 
The side chain of glutamine (Q) can form 4 hydrogen bonds with 4 water molecules.  There are 2 hydrogen donors from nitrogen and 2 hydrogen acceptors for oxygen. The –OH group of threonine (T) and tyrosine (Y) can form 3 hydrogen bonds with 3 water molecules (2 H-acceptors and 1 H-donor). Color code: Green = carbon, red = oxygen, blue = nitrogen, gray = hydrogen, yellow disks = hydrogen bonds.

Three types of alpha-helices and with nearly identical molecular structure 
There are 3 types of alpha-helices and with nearly identical molecular structure, namely: a) 1.5Å per amino acid rise, b) 100˚ per amino acid turn, c) 3.6 amino acids and 360˚ per helical turn, and d) 5.4Å per helical turn.  The 3 types of alpha-helices are: 1) mostly hydrophobic amino acids including Leucine (L), Isoleucine (I), Valine (V), Phenylalanine (F), Methionine (M) and Alanine (A) that are commonly found as the helical transmembrane segments in membrane proteins; 2) mostly hydrophilic amino acids including Aspartic acid (D), Glutamic acid (E), Glutamine (Q), Lysine (K), Arginine (R), Serine (S), Threonine (T), Tyrosine (Y) that are commonly found on the out layer in water-soluble globular proteins; 3) mixed hydrophobic and hydrophilic amino acids that are partitioned in 2 faces: hydrophobic face and hydrophilic face, in an analogy, like our fingers with front and back.  The These alpha-helices sometimes attach to surface of membrane lipid bilayer, or partially buried to the hydrophobic core and partially close to the surface of water-soluble globular proteins.

The QTY code 
The QTY Code is likely universally applicable and also reversible, namely, Q changes to L, T changes to V and I, and Y changes to F.  The QTY Code has been successful in designing many water-soluble variants of chemokine receptors and cytokine receptors. The QTY Code may likely be successfully applied to other water-insoluble aggregated proteins.  The QTY Code is robust and straightforward: it is the simplest tool to carry out membrane protein design without sophisticated computer algorithms. Thus, it can be used broadly. The QTY Code has implications for designing additional GPCRs and other membrane proteins including cytokine receptors that are directly involved in cytokine storm syndrome.

The QTY Code has also been applied to cytokine receptor water-soluble variants with the aim of combatting the cytokine storm syndrome (also called cytokine release syndrome) suffered by cancer patients receiving CAR-T therapy. This therapeutic application may be equally applicable to severely infected COVID-19 patients, for whom cytokine storms often lead to death.

In 2021, predictions of AlphaFold 2 program proved the validity of QTY code.

References

Further reading
 
 
 
 
 

Medicinal chemistry